Erotikon may refer to:

Erotikon (1920 film), Swedish comedy silent film
Erotikon (1929 film), Czech drama silent film
, Slovene film by Boštjan Hladnik
Erotikon, Lyric Pieces Op.43 No.5 for piano, by Grieg